Ashtray Basin is a small basin near the head of Arena Valley in Victoria Land. It was named by a field party of the University of New South Wales, Australia, that worked in this area in 1966–67. The name is reported to be descriptive of characteristic formations on the site.

References
 

Structural basins of Antarctica
Landforms of Victoria Land
Scott Coast